The 1990–91 BYU Cougars men's basketball team represented Brigham Young University in the 1990–91 basketball season. Led by head coach Roger Reid, and freshman star Shawn Bradley, the Cougars won their first WAC title, and made their first tournament appearance under Reid. Throughout the season, the 7 foot 6 inch Bradley gathered national attention, winning WAC freshman of the year. In the NCAA tournament, the Cougars defeated Virginia in the first round, before falling to Arizona in the Round of 32. Following this season, after taking two years off serving an LDS mission, Bradley would declare his eligibility for the NBA draft, becoming the second overall pick in 1993.

Postseason schedule
WAC Tournament
First Round Vs. Colorado State, Arena-Auditorium, Laramie, WY - W, 69-56
Semifinal Vs. Hawaii, Arena-Auditorium, Laramie, WY - W, 73-71 OT
Final Vs. Utah, Arena-Auditorium, Laramie, WY - W, 51-49 OT
NCAA Tournament
First Round Vs. Virginia, Huntsman Center, Salt Lake City, UT - W, 61-48
Round of 32 Vs. Arizona, Huntsman Center, Salt Lake City, UT - L, 61-76

References

BYU Cougars men's basketball seasons
Byu
Byu